The Noor-e-Islam Mosque is a mosque in Saint-Denis, Réunion.

History
The original building of the mosque was established in the 1890s. A petition was soon made and granted by Governor Laurent Marie Émile Beauchamps in 1898. The new mosque building then replaced the old building and was completed in 1905.

Architecture
The windows of the mosque bear the color of flag of France.

See also
 Islam in Réunion

References

1905 establishments in Réunion
Mosques in Réunion
Mosques completed in 1905
Buildings and structures in Saint-Denis, Réunion